Alan Thompson or Allan Thompson may refer to:
Alan Thompson (canoeist) (born 1959), New Zealand canoer, double gold medallist at the 1984 Summer Olympics
Alan Thompson (footballer, born 1952), English footballer, played for Sheffield Wednesday and Stockport County
Alan Thompson (footballer, born 1973), English footballer, played mainly for Bolton Wanderers and Celtic
Alan Thompson (rugby league) (born 1953), former Australian rugby player
Alan Thompson (swimming coach) (active since 1999), Australian swimming coach
Alan Thompson (British politician) (1924–2017), British Labour MP for Dunfermline
Alan Thompson (Washington politician) (1927–2019), American politician in the state of Washington
Alan Thompson (broadcaster) (1963–2017), Welsh radio broadcaster
Alan S. Thompson (born 1955), vice admiral in the United States Navy
Alan Thompson (Australian footballer) (born 1951), Australian rules footballer for Fitzroy
Allan Thompson (footballer) (1910–1984), Australian rules footballer for Fitzroy
Allan Thompson (comics), fictional character from The Adventures of Tintin by Hergé
Alan Thompson (American football) (born 1949), American football running back in the Canadian Football League
Alan J Thompson (neurologist)

See also
Ed Thompson (Wisconsin politician) (1944–2011), birth name Allan Thompson, American politician from Wisconsin
Allen Thompson (disambiguation)
Al Thompson (disambiguation)
Alan Thomson (disambiguation)